Lily Tomlin is an American actress, comedian, writer, singer, and producer who has received numerous accolades throughout her career, including a Daytime Emmy Award, a Grammy Award, six Primetime Emmy Awards, two Tony Awards, and nominations for an Academy Award, two British Academy Film Awards and seven Golden Globe Awards. She is one of the few performers to have been nominated for the four major American entertainment awards (EGOT).

Tomlin's breakout role was on the variety show Rowan & Martin's Laugh-In from 1969 until 1973, which earned her one Golden Globe Award and three Primetime Emmy Award nominations. She received four nominations for the Grammy Award for Best Comedy Recording, winning once for the 1971 comedy album This Is a Recording. She won her first two Emmy Awards for the 1973 CBS special Lily, in the categories of Outstanding Comedy-Variety, Variety or Music Special and Outstanding Writing in a Comedy-Variety, Variety or Music Special.

In 1975, Robert Altman cast Tomlin in the satirical musical film Nashville, who at the time had no prior film experience, having worked exclusively in television. Her performance earned her nominations for the Academy Award for Best Supporting Actress, the BAFTA Award for Most Promising Newcomer to Leading Film Roles, two Golden Globe Awards including Best Supporting Actress and New Star of the Year, and wins at the National Society of Film Critics and New York Film Critics Circle awards. She had her subsequent film role in The Late Show (1977), which was a critical success, with Tomlin winning the Silver Bear for Best Actress at the Berlin International Film Festival and being nominated for the BAFTA Award for Best Actress in a Leading Role and the Golden Globe Award for Best Actress in a Motion Picture – Comedy or Musical. In 1985, Tomlin starred in the one-woman Broadway show The Search for Signs of Intelligent Life in the Universe, written by her long-time life partner, writer/producer Jane Wagner. The production won her the Tony Award for Best Actress in a Play, two Drama Desk Awards, a New York Drama Critics' Circle Award and an Outer Critics Circle Award. She then won the 1995 Daytime Emmy Award for Outstanding Performer in an Animated Program for her voice acting in the animated series The Magic School Bus (1994–97) and had a recurring role in the political drama series The West Wing (1999–2006), that earned her three nominations at the Screen Actors Guild Awards. In 2015, she starred opposite to Jane Fonda in the successful comedy series Grace and Frankie (2015–2022), for which she received four consecutive nominations for the Primetime Emmy Award for Outstanding Lead Actress in a Comedy Series.

For her lifetime achievements, Tomlin was honored with the Mark Twain Prize for American Humor, the Screen Actors Guild Life Achievement Award, the TCA Career Achievement Award and a medallion at the Kennedy Center Honors.

Major associations

Academy Awards

BAFTA Awards

Emmy Awards

Golden Globe Awards

Grammy Awards

Screen Actors Guild Awards

Tony Awards

Honours

Kennedy Center Honors

Peabody Awards

Mark Twain Prize for American Humor

Screen Actors Guild Life Achievement Award

Miscellaneous awards

Notes

References

External links
  

Tomlin, Lily
Tomlin, Lily